Mankiala, commonly known as Mankiala Muslim, is a town in Gujar Khan Tehsil, Punjab, Pakistan. Mankiala is also the chief town of Union Council Mankiala, which is an administrative subdivision of the tehsil.

References

Populated places in Gujar Khan Tehsil
Union councils of Gujar Khan Tehsil

pnb:مانکیالہ